Daryl Skilling (born 17 May 1960) is a Canadian former swimmer. He competed in the men's 200 metre backstroke at the 1976 Summer Olympics.

References

External links
 

1960 births
Living people
Canadian male swimmers
Olympic swimmers of Canada
Swimmers at the 1976 Summer Olympics
Sportspeople from Wollongong
Pan American Games medalists in swimming
Pan American Games silver medalists for Canada
Swimmers at the 1975 Pan American Games
Medalists at the 1975 Pan American Games